Cremnorrhinini is a tribe of plant bugs in the family Miridae. There are about 50 genera in Cremnorrhinini, all but five in the subtribe Cremnorrhinina.

Genera
These 50 genera belong to the tribe Cremnorrhinini:
 Tribe Cremnorrhinini Reuter, 1883

 Genus Adunatiphylus Schuh & Schwartz, 2016 - Australia
 Genus Amblytylus Fieber, 1858 - Palearctic
 Genus Asterophylus Schuh & Schwartz, 2016 - Australia
 Genus Austroplagiognathus Schuh & Schwartz, 2016 - Australia
 Genus Austropsallus Schuh, 1974 - Africa
 Genus Bifidostylus Schuh & Schwartz, 2016 - Australia
 Genus Brachyceratocoris Knight, 1968 - Southwest Nearctic
 Genus Calidroides Schwartz, 2005 - Southwest Nearctic
 Genus Capecapsus Schuh, 1974 - Africa
 Genus Coatonocapsus Schuh, 1974 - Africa
 Genus Coquillettia Uhler, 1890 - Western Nearctic
 Genus Cremnorrhinus Reuter, 1880 - Palearctic
 Genus Dacota Uhler, 1872 - Holarctic
 Genus Denticulophallus Schuh, 1974 - Africa
 Genus Dicyphylus Schuh & Schwartz, 2016 - Australia
 Genus Eremotylus Schuh & Schwartz, 2016 - Australia
 Genus Ethelastia Reuter, 1876 - Palearctic
 Genus Euderon Puton, 1888 - Palearctic
 Genus Excentricoris Carvalho, 1955 - Palearctic
 Genus Grandivesica Schuh & Schwartz, 2016 - Australia
 Genus Guentherocoris Schuh & Schwartz, 2004 - Southwest Nearctic
 Genus Gyrophallus Schuh & Schwartz, 2016 - Australia
 Genus Halophylus Schuh & Schwartz, 2016 - Australia
 Genus Harpocera Curtis, 1838 - Palearctic
 Genus Heterocapillus Wagner, 1960 - Palearctic
 Genus Lepidophylus Schuh & Schwartz, 2016 - Australia
 Genus Leutiola Wyniger, 2012 - Western Nearctic
 Genus Lopidodenus V. Putshkov, 1974 - Palearctic
 Genus Lopus Hahn, 1833 - Western Palearctic
 Genus Macrotylus Fieber, 1858 - Holarctic, South Africa
 Genus Maculiphylus Schuh & Schwartz, 2016 - Australia
 Genus Monospiniphallus Schuh & Schwartz, 2016 - Australia
 Genus Myoporophylus Schuh & Schwartz, 2016 - Australia
 Genus Myrtophylus Schuh & Schwartz, 2016 - Australia
 Genus Omnivoriphylus Schuh & Schwartz, 2016 - Australia
 Genus Orectoderus Uhler, 1876 - Western Nearctic
 Genus Pachyxyphus Fieber, 1858 - Western Palearctic
 Genus Paralopus Wagner, 1957 - Palearctic
 Genus Parasciodema Poppius, 1914 - Africa
 Genus Pronotocrepis Knight, 1929 - Western Nearctic
 Genus Proteophylus Schuh & Schwartz, 2016 - Australia
 Genus Pulvillophylus Schuh & Schwartz, 2016 - Australia
 Genus Shendina Linnavuori, 1975 - Nearctic
 Genus Spinivesica Schuh & Schwartz, 2016 - Australia
 Genus Strophopoda Van Duzee, 1916 - Western Nearctic
 Genus Teleorhinus Uhler, 1890 - Western Nearctic
 Genus Telophylus Schuh & Schwartz, 2016 - Australia
 Genus Ticua Wyniger, 2012 - Western Nearctic
 Genus Utopnia Reuter, 1881 - Palearctic
 Genus Zinjolopus Linnavuori, 1975 - Palearctic

References

Phylinae